Ricard de Haro Jiménez  (born 15 February 1966) is an Andorran politician. He is a member of the Renovació Democràtica.

External links
Page at the General Council of the Principality of Andorra 

Members of the General Council (Andorra)
1966 births
Living people
Place of birth missing (living people)